Aleksey Valentinovich Mitrofanov (also transliterated as Alexei Mitrofanov; born 16 March 1962) is a Russian politician and deputy of the State Duma of Russia from the A Just Russia party. He has been Deputy Chairman of the State Duma's Committee on Credit Organizations and Financial Markets and a member of the LDPR Supreme Council.

Career
Mitrofanov ran for mayor of Moscow in 1999 and again in 2003, unsuccessfully both times. He served in the Ministry of Internal Affairs of the Soviet Union. He holds degrees in international relations from the Moscow State Institute of International Relations and from the USA-Canada Institute of the Soviet Academy of Sciences.

In 2005, he made and released a controversial erotic movie titled Yuliya, which portrayed two people called Misha and Yuliya in various sex scenes, who resembled then-Prime Minister of Ukraine Yulia Tymoshenko and President of Georgia Mikhail Saakashvili. He is also known for his strident nationalist comments. For instance, in November 2008, he claimed that the 2008–2009 Ukrainian financial crisis would shut down Ukraine's industry and that this collapse would make Ukraine become a part of the Russian Federation.

Mitrofanov left the Liberal Democratic Party of Russia (LDPR) in August 2007 to join A Just Russia, led by Sergei Mironov. Opinion polls at the time suggested that the LDPR would fail to gain representation in the Duma following the election in December 2007, while Fair Russia was expected to gain seats. LDPR leader Vladimir Zhirinovsky said Mitrofanov's departure would actually improve Mitrofanov's former party image.

Mitrofanov stood as the top candidate for the Fair Russia federal list in Penza during the 2007 Russian legislative election. He was not re-elected.

In 2011, he was elected to the State Duma of the Russian Federation.

t.A.T.u. Come Back
In 2006, Mitrofanov's book t.A.T.u. Come Back was published, a text message collection inspired by the band t.A.T.u. The novel was later made into a movie titled You and I, starring Mischa Barton and the two members of t.A.T.u., Lena Katina and Julia Volkova.

References

External links
 
 Aleksey Mitrofanov at Lentapedia 

1962 births
Living people
Politicians from Moscow
Moscow State Institute of International Relations alumni
Liberal Democratic Party of Russia politicians
Russian nationalists
First convocation members of the State Duma (Russian Federation)
Second convocation members of the State Duma (Russian Federation)
Third convocation members of the State Duma (Russian Federation)
Fourth convocation members of the State Duma (Russian Federation)
Sixth convocation members of the State Duma (Russian Federation)